Nynäshamn is a station on Stockholm's commuter train network, located in Nynäshamn within Nynäshamn Municipality and is the terminus for the Nynäs Line. On a normal winter weekday, the station has about 900 boarders (2015). The station has three tracks, which end with stop buffers. Entrance to the platform is geographically from the north (the track runs in a half loop through the city and ends in the "wrong" direction). The station no longer has an entrance building or ticket hall, but has weather protection on the platform. Nynäshamn is used as a transfer to the Destination Gotland ferries to the island of Gotland.

History 
The station was built as part of the Nynäs Line, and was opened to traffic in 1901. The old station building was designed by the architect Ferdinand Boberg. It is a wooden building with yellow-painted facades and has a similar appearance to other station buildings line, also designed by Boberg. Today, the building is owned by housing association Nynäshamnsbostäder.

The old station building is located some distance from the track area itself. This is it was originally planned for the tracks to end in front of the building. However, a longer track was built to enable direct connection to the Gotland boats. This occurred in the years 1902-1973 and 1995-2007.

In 2007, the platform located just beside Nynäshamn Ferry Terminal was closed to allow expansion of the ferry terminal, and the track was shortened by 500m to the current terminus.

Gallery

Station Building

Station Platforms

References 

Nynäshamn Municipality
Railway stations in Stockholm County
Railway stations opened in 1901
1901 establishments in Sweden